Gluboky (masculine), Glubokaya (feminine), or Glubokoye (neuter) is the name of several inhabited localities in Russia.

Urban localities
Gluboky, Kamensky District, Rostov Oblast, a work settlement in Kamensky District of Rostov Oblast

Rural localities
Gluboky, Amur Oblast, a railway station under the administrative jurisdiction of  Urusha Urban Settlement in Skovorodinsky District of Amur Oblast
Gluboky (settlement), Arkhangelsk Oblast, a settlement in Bestuzhevsky Selsoviet of Ustyansky District of Arkhangelsk Oblast
Gluboky (village), Arkhangelsk Oblast, a village in Bestuzhevsky Selsoviet of Ustyansky District of Arkhangelsk Oblast
Gluboky, Krasnodar Krai, a settlement in Novoselsky Rural Okrug of Novokubansky District of Krasnodar Krai
Gluboky, Zimovnikovsky District, Rostov Oblast, a khutor in Glubochanskoye Rural Settlement of Zimovnikovsky District of Rostov Oblast
Gluboky, Samara Oblast, a settlement in Sergiyevsky District of Samara Oblast
Gluboky, Saratov Oblast, a khutor in Alexandrovo-Gaysky District of Saratov Oblast
Gluboky, Stavropol Krai, a khutor in Pravokumsky Selsoviet of Sovetsky District of Stavropol Krai
Glubokoye, Altai Krai, a selo in Glubokovsky Selsoviet of Zavyalovsky District of Altai Krai
Glubokoye, Kemerovo Oblast, a selo in Zarubinskaya Rural Territory of Topkinsky District of Kemerovo Oblast
Glubokoye, Kurgan Oblast, a selo in Glubokinsky Selsoviet of Shadrinsky District of Kurgan Oblast
Glubokoye, Luzhsky District, Leningrad Oblast, a village in Osminskoye Settlement Municipal Formation of Luzhsky District of Leningrad Oblast
Glubokoye, Krasnoselskoye Settlement Municipal Formation, Vyborgsky District, Leningrad Oblast, a logging depot settlement in Krasnoselskoye Settlement Municipal Formation of Vyborgsky District of Leningrad Oblast
Glubokoye, Kamennogorskoye Settlement Municipal Formation, Vyborgsky District, Leningrad Oblast, a logging depot settlement in Kamennogorskoye Settlement Municipal Formation in Vyborgsky District of Leningrad Oblast
Glubokoye, Moscow Oblast, a selo in Uzunovskoye Rural Settlement of Serebryano-Prudsky District of Moscow Oblast
Glubokoye, Novgorod Oblast, a village in Gorskoye Settlement of Soletsky District of Novgorod Oblast
Glubokoye, Opochetsky District, Pskov Oblast, a village in Opochetsky District, Pskov Oblast
Glubokoye, Sebezhsky District, Pskov Oblast, a village in Sebezhsky District, Pskov Oblast
Glubokoye, Smolensk Oblast, a village in Glubokinskoye Rural Settlement of Krasninsky District of Smolensk Oblast
Glubokoye, Sverdlovsk Oblast, a settlement under the administrative jurisdiction of the City of Yekaterinburg in Sverdlovsk Oblast
Glubokoye, Bologovsky District, Tver Oblast, a village in Kaftinskoye Rural Settlement of Bologovsky District of Tver Oblast
Glubokoye, Vyshnevolotsky District, Tver Oblast, a village in Dyatlovskoye Rural Settlement of Vyshnevolotsky District of Tver Oblast
Glubokoye, Zapadnodvinsky District, Tver Oblast, a village in Zapadnodvinskoye Rural Settlement of Zapadnodvinsky District of Tver Oblast
Glubokoye, Tyumen Oblast, a village in Berdyuzhsky Rural Okrug of Berdyuzhsky District of Tyumen Oblast
Glubokoye, Lezhsky Selsoviet, Gryazovetsky District, Vologda Oblast, a village in Lezhsky Selsoviet of Gryazovetsky District of Vologda Oblast
Glubokoye, Vokhtogsky Selsoviet, Gryazovetsky District, Vologda Oblast, a khutor in Vokhtogsky Selsoviet of Gryazovetsky District of Vologda Oblast
Glubokoye, Totemsky District, Vologda Oblast, a settlement in Pyatovsky Selsoviet of Totemsky District of Vologda Oblast
Glubokoye, Voronezh Oblast, a selo in Novolimanskoye Rural Settlement of Petropavlovsky District of Voronezh Oblast
Glubokaya, Irkutsk Oblast, a settlement in Shelekhovsky District of Irkutsk Oblast
Glubokaya, Kurgan Oblast, a village in Talovsky Selsoviet of Yurgamyshsky District of Kurgan Oblast
Glubokaya, Sverdlovsk Oblast, a settlement under the administrative jurisdiction of the Town of Nizhnyaya Tura in Sverdlovsk Oblast
Glubokaya, Tyumen Oblast, a village in Lamensky Rural Okrug of Golyshmanovsky District of Tyumen Oblast